The Arte da Lingoa Canarim, the grammar of the Konkani language, was composed by the 16th-century English Jesuit priest Father Thomas Stephens, thus making Konkani the first among the modern Indian languages to have its grammar codified and described. The system was expanded upon by Diogo Ribeiro and four other Jesuits and printed in Rachol (located in the Indian state of Goa) in the year 1640. A second edition was then developed and introduced in 1857 by J.H. da Cunha Rivara, who possessed a great passion for Konkani. Consequently, three versions of the Arte exist:

Arte da lingoa Canari. MS held by the School of Oriental and African Studies, London.
Arte da lingoa Canarim, composed by Padre Thomaz Estevão and Padre Diogo Ribeiro of the Company of Jesus & amended by other Padres of the same company. 1640.
Grammatica da Lingua Concani, composed by Padre Thomaz Estevão of the Company of Jesus and edited by J.H. da Cunha Rivara. Nova Goa: Imprensa Nacional. 1857.

Canarim
Konkani has been known by a variety of names: canarim, concanim, gomantaki, bramana and goani. It is called amchi bhas ("our language") by native speakers and govi, or Goenchi bhas, by others. Learned Marathi speakers tend to call it gomantaki. 

The name canarim or lingua canarim, which is how Thomas Stephens himself refers to it in the title of his famous grammar, has always been intriguing. It is possible that the term is derived from the Persian word for coast, kinara; if so, it would be means "the language of the coast." The problem is that this term overlaps with Kanarese or Kannada. It is therefore not surprising to find Mariano Saldanha calling absurd the appellation lingua canarim, since the language of Goa, being derived from Sanskrit, has nothing to do with Kannada, which is a Dravidian language. The missionaries, who certainly travelled to Kanara as well, must have realized the infelicity of the term, but, not being philologists, continued to follow the current practice. Thus Stephens speaks of the lingua canarim, and a Portuguese missionary called his work Arte Canarina da lingoa do Norte, referring to the Konkanized Marathi of the northern provinces of Bassein, Bandra, and Bombay.

All the authors, however, recognized in Goa two forms of the language: the plebeian, called canarim, and the more regular, used by the educated classes, called lingua canarim brámana or simply brámana de Goa. Since the latter was the preferred choice of the Europeans (and also of other castes) for writing, sermons and religious purposes, it was this that became the norm for all the grammars, including that of Stephens'. The licence of the Ordinary given to his work refers to it as "arte da lingua canarin bramana". For his Purāṇa, Stephens preferred to use Marathi, and gives explicit notice of his choice, even though he also notes that he mixes this with the local "language of the Brahmins" so as to make his work more accessible. He was therefore well aware of the difference between Marathi and what he chose to call canarim.

References
 

Konkani
Grammar books
1640 books